Douglas Rupert Gordon Ayres (26 September 1906 – 25 September 1974) was  a former Australian rules footballer who played with Footscray in the Victorian Football League (VFL).

Family
The son of William Ayres, and Maude Ayres, née Watkins, Douglas Rupert Gordon Ayres was born at Randwick, New South Wales on 26 September 1906.

Death
He died at Bentleigh, Victoria on 25 September 1974.

See also
 1927 Melbourne Carnival
 1930 Adelaide Carnival

Notes

External links 
 
 
 Douglas Rupert Gordon Ayres, at NSW Australian Football History Society.

1906 births
1974 deaths
Australian rules footballers from New South Wales
Western Bulldogs players
Newtown Australian Football Club players